The following is a list of Michigan State Historic Sites in Livingston County, Michigan. Sites marked with a dagger (†) are also listed on the National Register of Historic Places in Livingston County, Michigan.


Current listings

See also
 National Register of Historic Places listings in Livingston County, Michigan

Sources
 Historic Sites Online – Livingston County. Michigan State Housing Developmental Authority. Accessed March 30, 2011.

References

Livingston County
State Historic Sites
Tourist attractions in Livingston County, Michigan